Hibbertia villifera is a species of flowering plant in the family Dilleniaceae and is endemic to South Australia. It is a shrub with rigid, woody branches, hairy foliage, linear to elliptic leaves and yellow flowers with seven to eleven stamens on one side of two hairy carpels.

Description
Flowering occurs from September to November.

Taxonomy
The first specimens of this species were collected in 1886 by Johann Tepper near Karatta on Kangaroo Island. Tepper labelled the specimens Hibbertia villifera. The species was first formally described in 2000 by Hellmut R. Toelken in the Journal of the Adelaide Botanic Gardens from specimens he collected near Vivonne Bay on Kangaroo Island in 1997. The specific epithet (villifera) means "bearing long, weak hairs".

Distribution and habitat
This hibbertia grows in heath or mallee on Kangaroo Island and the southern Mount Lofty Ranges.

See also
List of Hibbertia species

References

villifera
Flora of South Australia
Plants described in 2000
Taxa named by Hellmut R. Toelken